Cottage Grove may refer to a number of places in the United States:

Cottage Grove, Illinois
Cottage Grove, Indiana
Cottage Grove, Minnesota
Cottage Grove, Oregon
Cottage Grove, Tennessee
Cottage Grove, Wisconsin
Cottage Grove (town), Wisconsin
Cottage Grove Township, Allen County, Kansas
Cottage Grove, Houston, a community in Houston, Texas

See also
Cottage Grove, short for East 63rd-Cottage Grove (CTA), a transit station in Chicago's 'L' system